Grzegorz Cybulski (born 23 November 1951) is a retired Polish long jumper.

He was born in Nowa Sól, and represented the sports clubs Lumelu Zielona Góra and Śląska Wrocław. He finished eleventh at the 1972 European Indoor Championships, twelfth at the 1972 Olympic Games, won the bronze medal at the 1973 European Indoor Championships, finished fifth at the 1974 European Indoor Championships, won the gold medal at the 1975 Summer Universiade and the silver medal at the 1977 Summer Universiade, finished fourth at the 1978 European Championships. and sixth at the 1979 European Indoor Championships, He competed at the 1976 Olympic Games without reaching the final.

He became Polish champion in 1975, 1976, 1978 and 1979, and Polish indoor champion in 1973, 1974, 1976 and 1978.

His personal best jump was 8.27 metres, achieved in June 1975 in Warsaw.

References

1951 births
Living people
Polish male long jumpers
Athletes (track and field) at the 1972 Summer Olympics
Athletes (track and field) at the 1976 Summer Olympics
Olympic athletes of Poland
People from Nowa Sól
Sportspeople from Lubusz Voivodeship
Universiade medalists in athletics (track and field)
Universiade gold medalists for Poland
Medalists at the 1975 Summer Universiade
Medalists at the 1977 Summer Universiade
20th-century Polish people